
In basketball, an assist is a pass to a teammate that directly leads to a score by field goal. The top 25 highest assists totals in National Collegiate Athletic Association (NCAA) Division I women's basketball history are listed below. The NCAA did not immediately record assists throughout women's college basketball when it began sponsoring women's sports in the 1981–82 school year; it began recording assists in Division I in 1984–85.

The all-time leader in career assists is Suzie McConnell of Penn State. She recorded 1,307 assists in 128 games (10.21 per game average) between 1984–85 and 1987–88. Second on the list is Andrea Nagy of FIU, who compiled 1,165 assists. Only three other women have recorded 1,000 career assists at the Division I level: Courtney Vandersloot of Gonzaga (1,118), Sabrina Ionescu of Oregon (1,091), and Tine Freil of Pacific (1,088).

All but one of the players listed compiled their totals in the standard four seasons. The exception is Neacole Hall of Alabama State, who compiled 869 assists despite playing only three seasons in Division I (1986–87 to 1988–89). Hall is also the all-time Division I leader in assists per game with 10.35, slightly ahead of McConnell's 10.21. In all, 16 of the top 25 players in career assists are also in the top 25 for assists per game. 

Two schools have two players represented in the top 25 of the all-time career assists leader board — FIU with Nagy and Dalma Iványi, and Ohio State with Samantha Prahalis and Carmen Grande. Grande is also the only individual in the top 25 to have played at more than one school; she played three years at Ball State before transferring to Ohio State for her final season.

Key

Top 25 career assists leaders

Footnotes

References
General
 

Specific

NCAA Division I women's basketball statistical leaders
Lists of women's basketball players in the United States